Jared Vanderaa (born May 12, 1992) is an American mixed martial artist who competed in the Heavyweight division of the Ultimate Fighting Championship.

Background
Vanderaa was born in Washington but moved around a lot with his mother in pursuit of opportunities, eventually settling in California. Vanderaa started training MMA in February 2010, right after wrestling season, and had his amateur first fight in October 2010. He started wrestling at 15, a sophomore in high school and then dislocated his shoulder right at the end of the season. He got it fixed and joined an MMA gym immediately after, beginning his MMA journey. He attended California Baptist University but dropped out after a couple of days.

Mixed martial arts career

Early career
Vanderaa competed as an amateur from 2012 to 2015, in the heavyweight and light heavyweight divisions. He compiled a record of 5–4. In his professional debut, he submitted John Rizzo via rear-naked choke in the first round. Vanderaa defeated his next four foes all by stoppages. Vanderaa faced Richard Odoms at LFA 15 for the LFA Heavyweight Championship on June 30, 2017. He lost the bout via kimura in the 5th round.

After tapping out Idrees Wasi in first round at Global Knockout 10, he made his Extreme Fighting Championship debut in South Africa at EFC 66, losing the split decision to Andrew van Zyl for the EFC Heavyweight Championship.

After losing a short notice bout via unanimous decision to Vernon Lewis at LFA 35, Vanderaa defeated Elvis Moyo via TKO in the second round at EFC 73. Vanderaa then defeated UFC veteran Ruan Potts via TKO in round two at EFC 76, winning the EFC Heavyweight Championship. At EFC 77, Vanderaa defended the title, defeating Ricky Mischolas via TKO in the second round. At LFA 74, Vanderaa lost to Renan Ferreira via triangle choke submission in the second round. He rebounded, defeating Tony Lopez via unanimous decision at SMASH Global 9, winning the Smash Global Heavyweight Championship.

At Dana White's Contender Series 34, Vanderaa defeated Harry Hunsucker via TKO in the first round, securing him a contract from the UFC.

Ultimate Fighting Championship
Vanderaa was scheduled to face Sergey Spivak on December 12, 2020, at UFC 256 However, Vanderaa tested positive for COVID-19 during fight week and had to withdraw. The pair eventually met on February 20, 2021, at UFC Fight Night 185. Vanderaa lost the fight via technical knockout in round two.

Vanderaa faced Justin Tafa on May 22, 2021, at UFC Fight Night: Font vs. Garbrandt. He won the fight via unanimous decision. This bout earned him the Fight of the Night award.

Vanderaa faced Alexander Romanov on October 9, 2021, at UFC Fight Night: Dern vs. Rodriguez. He lost the fight via technical knockout in round two.

Vanderaa was scheduled to face Azamat Murzakanov, replacing Philipe Lins on December 4, 2021, at UFC on ESPN 31. However, shortly after the weigh-ins, officials announced that the bout had been canceled due to Vanderaa not being medically cleared.

Vanderaa faced Andrei Arlovski on February 12, 2022, at UFC 271. He lost the back-and-forth fight via split decision. 18 out of 18 media scores gave it to Arlovski.

Vanderaa faced Aleksei Oleinik, replacing Ilir Latifi, on April 9, 2022, at UFC 273. He lost the fight via scarf hold submission in the first round.

Vanderaa faced Chase Sherman on July 9, 2022, at UFC on ESPN: dos Anjos vs. Fiziev. He lost the fight via knockout in round three.

As the last fight of his prevailing contract, Vanderaa faced Waldo Cortes-Acosta on October 29, 2022, at UFC Fight Night 213. He lost the fight via unanimous decision.

After five straight losses, Vanderaa was released by UFC in December 2022.

Personal life
Vanderaa and his fiancée Lauren have two daughters, born in 2017 and 2021.

Vanderaa and his fiancée own the Team Quest gym in Hemet, which is the successor of PrimeTime MMA where Jared began his career.

Championships and accomplishments

Mixed martial arts
Ultimate Fighting Championship
Fight of the Night (One time) 
SMASH Global
SG Heavyweight Championship (One time)
Extreme Fighting Championship 
EFC Heavyweight Championship (One time)
One successful title defence

Mixed martial arts record

|Loss
|align=center|12–10
|Waldo Cortes-Acosta
|Decision (unanimous)
|UFC Fight Night: Kattar vs. Allen
|
|align=center|3
|align=center|5:00
|Las Vegas, Nevada, United States
|
|-
|Loss
|align=center|12–9
|Chase Sherman
|TKO (punches)
|UFC on ESPN: dos Anjos vs. Fiziev
|
|align=center|3
|align=center|3:10
|Las Vegas, Nevada, United States
|
|-
|Loss
|align=center|12–8
|Aleksei Oleinik
|Submission (scarf hold)
|UFC 273
|
|align=center|1
|align=center|3:39
|Jacksonville, Florida, United States
|
|-
|Loss
|align=center|12–7
|Andrei Arlovski
|Decision (split)
|UFC 271
|
|align=center|3
|align=center|5:00
|Houston, Texas, United States
|
|-
|Loss
|align=center|12–6
|Alexander Romanov
|TKO (punches)
|UFC Fight Night: Dern vs. Rodriguez
|
|align=center|2
|align=center|4:43
|Las Vegas, Nevada, United States
|
|-
|Win
|align=center|12–5
|Justin Tafa
|Decision (unanimous)
|UFC Fight Night: Font vs. Garbrandt
|
|align=center|3
|align=center|5:00
|Las Vegas, Nevada, United States
|
|-
|Loss
|align=center|11–5
|Sergey Spivak
|TKO (punches)
|UFC Fight Night: Blaydes vs. Lewis
|
|align=center|2
|align=center|4:32
|Las Vegas, Nevada, United States
|
|-
|Win
|align=center|11–4
|Harry Hunsucker
|TKO (punches)
|Dana White's Contender Series 34
|
|align=center|1
|align=center|3:34
|Las Vegas, Nevada, United States
|
|-
|Win
|align=center|10–4
|Tony Lopez
|Decision (unanimous)
|SMASH Global 9
|
|align=center|5
|align=center|5:00
|Hollywood, California, United States
|
|-
|Loss
|align=center|9–4
|Renan Ferreira
|Submission (triangle choke)
|LFA 74
|
|align=center|2
|align=center|2:37
|Riverside, California, United States
|
|-
|Win
|align=center|9–3
|Ricky Misholas
|TKO (punches)
|EFC 77
|
|align=center|2
|align=center|1:49
|Pretoria, South Africa
|
|-
|Win
|align=center|8–3
|Ruan Potts
|TKO (punches)
|EFC 76
|
|align=center|3
|align=center|3:24
|Pretoria, South Africa
|
|-
|Win
|align=center|7–3
|Elvis Moyo
|TKO (punches)
|EFC 73
|
|align=center|2
|align=center|2:00
|Sun City, South Africa
|
|-
|Loss
|align=center|6–3
|Vernon Lewis
|Decision (unanimous)
|LFA 35
|
|align=center|3
|align=center|5:00
|Houston, Texas, United States
|
|-
|Loss
|align=center|6–2
|Andrew van Zyl
|Decision (split)
|EFC 66
|
|align=center|5
|align=center|5:00
|Pretoria, South Africa
|
|-
|Win
|align=center|6–1
|Idrees Wasi
|Submission (straight ankle lock)
|GKO 10
|
|align=center|1
|align=center|1:35
|Jackson, California, United States
|
|-
|Loss
|align=center|5–1
|Richard Odoms
|Submission (kimura)
|LFA 15
|
|align=center|5
|align=center|2:45
|Shawnee, Oklahoma, United States
|
|-
|Win
|align=center|5–0
|Sean Johnson
|Submission (guillotine choke)
|SMASH Global 4
|
|align=center|1
|align=center|2:28
|Los Angeles, California, United States
|
|-
|Win
|align=center|4–0
|Mychal Clark
|TKO (punches)
|BAMMA Badbeat 20
|
|align=center|1
|align=center|0:20
|Commerce, California, United States
|
|-
|Win
|align=center|3–0
|Joe Hernandez
|KO (punch)
|SMASH Global 3
|
|align=center|2
|align=center|1:13
|Los Angeles, California, United States
|
|-
|Win
|align=center|2–0
|Daylin Murray
|TKO (punches)
|The Main Event 2
|
|align=center|1
|align=center|4:11
|San Diego, California, United States
|
|-
|Win
|align=center|1–0
|John Rizzo
|Submission (rear-naked choke)
|KOTC: Sanctioned
|
|align=center|1
|align=center|0:29
|San Jacinto, California, United States
|

See also 

 List of male mixed martial artists

References

External links 
  
 

1992 births
Living people
American male mixed martial artists
Heavyweight mixed martial artists
Mixed martial artists utilizing wrestling
Mixed martial artists utilizing Brazilian jiu-jitsu
Ultimate Fighting Championship male fighters
American practitioners of Brazilian jiu-jitsu
People awarded a black belt in Brazilian jiu-jitsu